The Soratte Bunker is an air raid shelter located under Monte Soratte near Rome, Italy. It was part of a subterranean bunker complex constructed between 1937 an 1943. It was the Headquarters used by Generalfeldmarschall Albert Kesselring from September 1943 to June 1944. The structure still represents one of the most impressive military engineering works of Europe.

Construction 
In the late 1930s, the Italian government commissioned a network of underground galleries and anti-aircraft bunkers under Monte Soratte, about 45 km (28 mi) north of Rome.

Secret excavation work began in 1937 to build a huge air-raid shelter intended to house the Italian government and Comando Supremo should Rome come under siege. The works were conducted by direction of Military Engineering Corps of Rome. Over 4.5 km of underground tunnels were dug into the bowels of the Mountain. The tunnels were reinforced with a layer of cement up to a meter thick and they extended to a depth of over 300 meters (985 feet) underground. The bunker occupied almost 500,000 cubic yards. It had its own water supply, a heating system, electric generator, sewers, radio communications, dormitories, kitchens, storerooms and arms deposits. The complex was initially to spread along 14 km (9 mi) of galleries deep under the mountain, but the work was never completed because of the Italian capitulation.

After the 8 September 1943 Frascati air raid, the extensive bunker became the headquarters of the German occupying forces commanded by Generalfeldmarschall Albert Kesselring.  A heavy Allied aerial bombardment, which took place in May 12, 1944 with the aim of destroying the base, failed, and only 100 German soldiers died of the 1,000 inhabiting the bunker. The Wehrmacht occupied the mountain until the liberation of Rome. Before leaving the bunker, Generalfeldmarschall Kesselring ordered to mine and set fire to the galleries, but the damage to the structures was relative.

In the 1950s, the Italian Ministry of Defence used the bunker as a powder magazine before abandoning it in 1962. In the 1960s, during the years of Cold War, the bunker was turned into a fallout shelter for the Italian government and President in case of a nuclear attack on Rome.  It would have housed 50 members of the government and 50 NATO technicians. Work on the construction of the atomic bunker began in 1967 and lasted until 1972. In 1989 the bunker fell into disuse. It was kept secret until 2008. Soratte underground network can now be visited.

Notes

Gallery

Bibliography 

 
 

Bunkers
Italy in World War II